Povilas Mykolaitis (born 23 February 1983 in Marijampolė) is a Lithuanian long jumper. His personal record is 8.15 metres, reached at 2011 in Kaunas, which also is national record.

He represented Lithuania in 2005 World Championships in Athletics and 2010 European Championships in Athletics without reaching the final.

Achievements

References

1983 births
Living people
Lithuanian male long jumpers
People from Marijampolė
Athletes (track and field) at the 2012 Summer Olympics
Olympic athletes of Lithuania